Prince Heinrich XXIV Reuss of Köstritz, also Prince Heinrich XXIV Reuss, Younger Line  (German: Heinrich XXIV. Prinz Reuß zu Köstritz, also Heinrich XXIV. Prinz Reuß jüngere Linie, December 8, 1855 in Trebschen – October 2, 1910 in Ernstbrunn, Austria) was a German composer.

Life 
Heinrich XXIV was born in Trebschen in the March of Brandenburg, descendant of the Reuss-Köstritz line, the Younger Line, of the extended German noble family of Reuss. He was the son of Prince (Fürst, monarch) Heinrich IV Reuss of Köstritz (26 April 1821 - 25 July 1894) and Princess Luise Caroline Reuss of Greiz (3 December 1822 - 28 February 1875) and a brother of Eleonore Reuss of Köstritz, Tsaritsa of Bulgaria. Heinrich XXIV spent his youth in Vienna, where he was influenced greatly by the artistic atmosphere of his parents' home. He received his first music lessons in piano, organ and counterpoint from his father Heinrich IV, himself a dilettante and composition student of Carl Gottlieb Reissiger.

Heinrich XXIV received formal music instruction in Dresden, and continued his studies at the Universities, first in Bonn, then in Leipzig where he was a pupil of Wilhelm Rust. Despite his obvious musical talent, he decided to pursue a degree in law. After graduating in 1883, however, he devoted himself almost exclusively to his musical interests. Starting in 1881 he studied composition with Heinrich von Herzogenberg, to whom he developed a friendly attachment. Through Herzogenberg he came to know Johannes Brahms, whom he much admired. Although he never received formal instruction from Brahms, he did receive many helpful hints from Brahms, "teaching him more in ten minutes than Herzogenberg managed to do in months."

On May 27, 1884, Heinrich XXIV was married to his cousin Princess Elisabeth Reuss of Köstritz (1860–1931). The union produced five children. Heinrich XXIV Reuss of Köstritz died two months before his 55th birthday in Ernstbrunn in Lower Austria, the ancestral seat from 1828.

Musical style 
The musical style of Heinrich XXIV was strongly influenced by Brahms, however, on the whole it differs from that being lighter in tone, and thus resembles more the style of his teacher, Heinrich von Herzogenberg. A stylistic proximity to the works of Antonín Dvořák is evident. Heinrich XXIV's compositions display a masterful command of musical form and technique, especially in contrapuntal voice leading. As with Brahms, Dvořák and Herzogenberg, chamber music was his main field of creativity; he contributed numerous works in various genres. Notable among his other creations are his six symphonies.

During his lifetime, the compositions of Heinrich XXIV enjoyed a good reputation even in academic circles. Max Reger was also one of his admirers. Even in the years after his death, his compositions were warmly recommended by various musical authorities, as expressed, for example, by the musicologist Wilhelm Altmann in the third volume of his Handbook for String Quartet Players published in 1929. He wrote concerning the String Sextet No. 2 in B minor: "[It] is a work with artistic value close to that of the two Brahms Sextets. Every friend of chamber music should know it." Since 1930, word of the composer and his works has become increasingly silent.

Selected works 
Orchestra
 Symphony No. 1 in C minor, Op. 10 (1892)
 Symphony No. 2 in D major - LOST (Stolle biography, p. 103)
 Symphony No. 3 in E minor, Op. 28 (1907)
 Symphony No. 4 in A major, Op. 30
 Symphony No. 5 in F minor, Op. 34 (published 1907)
 Symphony No. 6 in E major, Op. 36 (published 1909)

Chamber music
 String Quartet No. 1 in D minor, Op. 1 (1881?)
 String Quintet in F major for 2 violins, 2 violas and cello, Op. 4 (1887)
 Sonata No. 1 in G minor for violin and piano, Op. 5 (published by Peters, 1888)
 Piano Quartet in F minor, Op. 6 (1895)
 Sonata in C major for cello and piano, Op. 7 (1895)
 String Quartet No. 2 in F major, Op. 11
 String Sextet No. 1 in D minor, Op. 12 (1899)
 Piano Trio in C minor, Op. 14 (1903) 
 Piano Quintet in C major, Op. 15 (1902)
 String Quartet No. 3 in A major, Op. 16 (1903)
 String Sextet No. 2 in B minor, Op. 17 (1902)
 Sonata No. 2 for violin and piano, Op. 21 (published c.1880?)
 Sonata in G major for viola and piano, Op. 22 (by 1904)
 String Quartet No. 4 in G minor, Op. 23, No. 1 (published 1904)
 String Quartet No. 5 in E major, Op. 23, No. 2 (pub. 1904)
 Piano Trio in A major for violin, viola and piano, Op. 25

Piano
 Drei Präludien (3 Preludes), Op. 2
 Suite, Op. 8 (1895) 
Praeludium
   Allemande
   Gavotte
   Siciliano
   Bourrée
   Sarabande
   Gigue
 Variationen und Fuge über ein eigenes Thema (Variations and Fugue on an Original Theme), Op. 19 (published c. 1904)

Vocal
 Fünf Lieder (5 Songs) for voice and piano, Op. 3 (1883); texts by Ludwig Uhland and Nikolaus Lenau
 Tu nos fecisti ad te, Motet for mixed chorus a capella, Op. 24 (published c. 1890); text by Aurelius Augustinus
 3 Geistliche Lieder (3 Sacred Songs) for 3-part women's chorus and organ or piano, Op. 27 (published 1907)

References

External links 
 
 Heinrich XXIV Prinz Reuss zu Köstritz lineage at thepeerage.com

1855 births
1910 deaths
19th-century classical composers
19th-century German musicians
19th-century German male musicians
20th-century classical composers
20th-century German composers
20th-century German male musicians
German Romantic composers
German male classical composers
People from the Province of Brandenburg
People from Zielona Góra County
Princes of Reuss